George O'Connor may refer to:

George O'Connor (singer) (1874–1946), American singer and lawyer
George O'Connor (hurler) (born 1959), retired Irish hurler
George O'Connor (comics) (born 1973), American author, cartoonist and illustrator
George O'Connor (footballer) (1892–1921), Australian rules footballer
George G. O'Connor (1914–1971) U.S. Army general

See also
George Connor (disambiguation)